Kosovo A Power Station is a lignite power station with five units at Obilić, Kosovo. It is the second largest power station in Kosovo with capacity of 650 MW after Kosovo B Power Station. It is described as the worst single-point source of pollution in Europe.
Despite plans to shut the plan down in 2017, it was still partially operating as of September 2022.

History
Kosovo A Power Station was opened in 1962. It was operated by EPS Surface Mining Kosovo and EPS TPP Kosovo until the end of Kosovo War. After UNMIK administration was established in Kosovo on 1 July 1999, Elektroprivreda Srbije (EPS) lost its access to the local coal mines and power plants, including Kosovo A and Kosovo B power plants.

Since then, it is operated by Kosovo Energy Corporation.

On 6 June 2014, the power station exploded killing two people and injuring 13 others. The station was then subsequently shut down. The cause of the explosion was due to the explosion of hydrogen tank located in a separate part of the power station from the generator.

In December 2015, US-based company ContourGlobal signed a memorandum of understanding with the Government of Kosovo, to build a new $1.06 billion worth power plant to replace 45-year old Kosovo A Power Station. The construction was expected to start in 2018, but ContourGlobal quit the project in 2020.

Generation units

See also
 Kosovo B Power Station
 Electrical energy in Kosovo

Notes

References

External links 
 http://issuu.com/lptap/docs/tpp-task-4-environmental-and-social-impact

Coal-fired power stations in Kosovo